Hit and run (or hit-and-run), usually refers to the act of causing (or contributing to) a traffic accident and failing to stop and identify oneself afterwards.

Hit and run or hit n run may also refer to:

Film
 Hit and Run (1924 film), a silent American comedy drama film
 Hit and Run (1957 film), a film noir starring Cleo Moore
 Hit and Run (2009 film), a horror film
 Hit and Run (2012 film), an action comedy starring Dax Shepard
 Hit and Run Productions, a British film company
 Hit and Run (1997), a film starring Kari Wuhrer
 Hit & Run (2019), a Indonesian film starring Joe Taslim

Television
 "Hit and Run" (Modern Family), a third-season episode of Modern Family
 "Hit and Run" (NCIS), a tenth-season episode of NCIS
 "Hit and Run", a second-season episode of Strangers With Candy
 "Hit and Run", the fourth episode of the first season of ER
"Hit & Run" (TV series), a TV series (2021)
 "Hit and Run" (Better Call Saul), the fourth episode of the sixth season of Better Call Saul

Music
 Hit and Run (band), an American bluegrass band
 Hit n Run Tour (Kiss tour)
 Hit n Run Tour (2000), an American tour by Prince
 Hit & Run Music Publishing

Albums 
 Hit & Run (Big Sugar album), 2003
 Hit and Run (Girlschool album), 1981, or the title song
 Hit and Run (T.S.O.L. album), 1987
 Hit & Run (EP), by Sloan
 Hit n Run Phase One, 2015
 Hit n Run Phase Two, 2015

Songs 
 "Hit & Run", by Greyson Chance from Somewhere Over My Head
 "Hit 'n' Run" (Monrose song)
 "Hit and Run" by The Bar-Kays, from Nightcruising
 "Hit and Run" (Breathe Carolina song)
 "Hit and Run" by Kim Carnes, from Mistaken Identity
 "Hit 'N' Run" by Skazi, from Total Anarchy
 "Hit and Run",single by Lolo
 "Hit and Run" by Loleatta Holloway, from Loleatta
 "Hit and Run" (Jo Jo Zep & The Falcons song)
 "Hit and Run", by Total Contrast
 "Hit n Run", by Rose Batiste
 "Hit and Run", song by Super Furry Animals, B-side to "Demons", 1997

Literature
 Hit and Run (novel), by Lurlene McDaniel
 Hit and Run, a novel by Lawrence Block
 Hit & Run: The New Zealand SAS in Afghanistan and the meaning of honour, a book by Nicky Hager and Jon Stephenson about Operation Burnham

Other uses
 Hit and run (baseball)
 Hit and Run (blog)
 Hit & Run (G.I. Joe)
 Hit-and-run posting, an Internet forum tactic
 Hit-and-run tactics, a military doctrine
 The Simpsons: Hit & Run, a 2003 video game